Meeting of Three Waters is a waterfall of Scotland.

The waterfall is situated at the foot of the Three Sisters of Glen Coe - a popular hiking and skiing area.
Water is collected from three different sources that meet at this waterfall, before joining Loch Achtriochtan to the west.

See also
Waterfalls of Scotland

References

Waterfalls of Highland (council area)